Haub is a surname. Notable people with this surname include:

 Christian W.E. Haub (born 1964), American businessman
 Elizabeth Haub (1899–1977), German heiress, philanthropist and environmentalist
 Erivan Haub (1932–2018), German businessman
 Karl-Erivan Haub (1960–2018), German-American businessman